José Diéguez Reboredo (25 April 1934 – 18 July 2022) was a Spanish Roman Catholic priest who served as bishop of Osma-Soria (1984–1987), Ourense (1987–1996) and Tui-Vigo (1996–2010).

Biography 
Diéguez studied at the Seminary of Santiago de Compostela and in Salamanca. He graduated in exact sciences from the University of Santiago de Compostela and was a professor of mathematics at the Minor Seminary of Compostela. He was also Bishop of Osma-Soria (1984–1987) and Orense (1987–1996).

On 7 June 1996, he took over the diocese of Tuy-Vigo. In April 2009 he submitted to the Pope his resignation for having turned seventy-five years of age, a resignation that was accepted on 28 January 2010.

Diéguez died in the early afternoon of 18 July 2022, in Santiago de Compostela, where he was chaplain of the Little Sisters of the Forsaken Elderly. A few days earlier he had suffered a stroke for which he had been hospitalized.

References 

1934 births
2022 deaths
Spanish Roman Catholic bishops
20th-century Roman Catholic bishops in Spain
21st-century Roman Catholic bishops in Spain
Bishops appointed by Pope John Paul II
Pontifical University of Salamanca alumni
University of Santiago de Compostela alumni
People from Arzúa (comarca)